Outlook Media was a Columbus, Ohio-based lesbian, gay, bisexual, transgender (LGBT) lifestyle and advocacy company for the Ohio queer and allied community from 1995 until late 2017. Their flagship product, Outlook Columbus was a news, politics, and lifestyle magazine. Outlook Media also published High Street Neighborhoods, managed Columbus' LGBT and allied business networking group, Network Columbus, and partnered with the Ohio Historical Society to form the Gay Ohio History Initiative.  In 2015, Outlook Media began to publish The Love Big LGBT Wedding Expo Guide, and began holding Love Big LGBT Wedding Expos throughout Ohio.

Publications and Community Initiatives

Outlook Columbus
Outlook Columbus was a monthly lifestyle and advocacy magazine geared toward Ohio's LGBT and urban progressive communities. Editorial coverage includes politics, small businesses, arts & entertainment, health & wellness, faith, fashion, sports, interviews, horoscopes, events and community news. With content that contains both locally and nationally focused features.  The publication replaced Outlook Weekly as the company's primary publication. With over 25,000 print copies distributed monthly, the magazine can be found for free in over 3,000 locations throughout Ohio, including local libraries, restaurants, and night clubs or by paid, home-delivery subscription. Outlook Columbus differentiates itself from similar LGBT publications by its advertising. Outlook doesn't limit its partners to gay-owned or gay-themed advertisers but also gay-friendly or straight owned but open-minded type businesses including national advertisers Bank One, Time Warner, and American Express among local businesses. The magazine's content is diverse as well, targeting a large cross section of the community while at the same time speaking to specific groups under the large LGBT umbrella. According to studies listed on their corporate website, Outlook Columbus is the number one media choice for the Columbus LGBT and allied community, the number one media choice for newcomers to Columbus who have been in the city for 5 years or less, and the number two print choice for African Americans in Columbus.

Outlookohio.com was the magazine's online counterpart.  Boasting 100 times the content of the print publication, the website keeps readers engaged all month long with fresh daily content, news, event photos, contests, polls, videos and reader comments.

In 2015, Outlook celebrated 20 years of publishing.

In June 2017, Outlook ceased publication.

Love Big LGBT Wedding Expos 
Ohio's only LGBT and allied wedding expo series, Love Big Expos offer a safe and welcoming place for LGBT couples to meet vendors who are committed to marriage equality and excited to serve the LGBT community. Love Big relieves the added stress of coming out to potentially non-supportive vendors by putting equality-minded businesses all in one place. Because Ohio still does not legally recognize marriage equality, LGBT couples have to go out of state to get their licensing. However, more and more Ohio LGBT couples are choosing to hold their big religious ceremonies and receptions in the state.

Events are free and open to the public. Straight couples are welcome, too.

Love Big LGBT Wedding Guide 
Ohio's first print and digital LGBT wedding guide & directory, Love Big Wedding Guide is a free, full color, perfect bound 9″ x 10.875″, premium paper stock magazine featuring equality-minded vendors servicing the Ohio market. The advertorial-focused guidebook is complemented by original industry focused content. Over 50,000 copies will be distributed statewide annually to wedding vendors, shops, universities, restaurants, coffee houses, libraries, community centers and subscribers.

High Street Neighborhoods

High Street Neighborhoods is a bi-annual, community based saver-magazine whose audience is the general public that resides within the Columbus urban core. Each issue is divided into community based sections where local advertisers present coupons. These communities include Merion Village, German Village, the Brewery District, Downtown, the King Lincoln District, the Arena District, the Short North Arts District, the University District, Clintonville, Worthington, Grandview, Franklinton, and Old Town East. Features also include a travel guide, service directory, and pet directory. The publication is distributed to more than 200 Columbus locations where it can be found for free including recreation centers, Columbus YMCA, and Experience Columbus visitors centers.

Live Local Columbus
Live Local Columbus Magazine was a joint venture with Columbus, Ohio's shop local program, The Small Business Beanstalk. Live Local focused on the authentic experiences of Columbus locals, telling their stories and curating the best possible Columbus experiences for readers.

Network Columbus
Network Columbus has been dubbed Central Ohio's 'gay chamber of commerce.'  The organization, with 3000 members, provides networking events, educational programs, business advocacy and linkages with other business and professional organizations with the purpose to lead and support economic growth within the central Ohio LGBT community.

Gay Ohio History Initiative
Outlook Media and The Ohio Historical Society created this initiative to include memorabilia and memories for gays across the state. As of summer 2010, two exhibits, Remembering the Berwick Ball, and The International Drag King Community Extravaganza Exhibit, have been curated by the Gay Ohio History initiative. A traveling exhibit is in the works.

Past Publications and Initiatives

Radio Outlook
Radio Outlook is a weekly GLBT talk-radio show and the first of its kind in Ohio. Hosted by Chris Hayes and Chad Frye, the show has a leftward lean, targeting the GLBT community but is enjoyed by a larger audience who enjoyed current events and friendly, informed banter.

TV Outlook
TV Outlook is similar in format to Radio Outlook. It was available on WDEM-CD.

Outlook
Outlook was the company's first publication. It was a bi-weekly newspaper and followed a newspaper approach in layout based in strong journalism and professional design, rather than serving as a promotional publication for the Greater Columbus LGBT community. Circulation was between 8,000 and 12,000 and distributed to over 200 locations.

Outlook Weekly
Outlook Weekly replaced Outlook as the companies primary publication. Published every week rather than every other week, the newspaper had similar content and format. In 2004, the publication switched content slightly, from just a news tabloid to a lifestyle tabloid as well.

History
Outlook Publishing, Inc. was founded by co-owners and publishers Jeffrey D. Cox and Jim Ryan in the spring of 1995 with the primary purpose of publishing their paper titled Outlook. Ryan was editor and managed distribution while Cox managed finances, layout, and design from his home. The paper relied on volunteer initiative and freelance reporters to operate. Before ''Outlooks establishment, the only other GLBT focused publications in Ohio were the Gay People's Chronicle, which was based out of Cleveland, and a monthly publication from Stonewall Columbus. Outlook was created to fill the void as a news voice for the Columbus community.

Under Cox, and Ryan's ownership, the newspaper quickly became respected as a professional news source. In the fall of 1998, Outlook earned five writing awards, called the Vice Versa Awards for Excellence in the Gay and Lesbian Press, from the National Gay and Lesbian Journalists Association and received third place for Best Newspaper in the weekly or bi-weekly category. These awards were given for the paper's approach to controversial topics and the effect they had on the Columbus community. For example, when Outlook published a piece about anti-gay harassment by members of the Ohio State University wrestling team, the OSU Athletic Department created mandatory sexual orientation cultural competence training for all its employees.

In early 1999, Outlook Publishing, Inc. was sold to Lynn Greer, Jose Rodriguez, and Malcolm Riggle operating from Riggle's offices in Worthington, Ohio. Within the year Rodriguez sold his share of the company to Greer and Riggle.

In the fall of 2003, Malcom Riggle assumed sole-ownership of company operations. Under his leadership, Outlook Weekly became a lifestyle tabloid. That November, Outlook Publishing, Inc. changed names to Outlook Media, Inc. Two years later, in the fall of 2005, Outlook teamed with the Ohio Historical Society to form the Gay Ohio History Initiative. Also within the year, the magazine saw controversy in a surrounding Columbus, Ohio suburb. Some members of the Upper Arlington community tried to ban the newspaper from its libraries, but after library board discussions the paper was decided to remain available to patrons.

In 2006, Outlook Media changed ownership after seven years under Malcom Riggle. Chris Hayes and Michael Daniels bought the company and moved Outlook's offices to The Short North. Under their leadership, Outlook Weekly'''s audience expanded to the Columbus progressive community while still maintaining its readership base in the GLBT community. In the summer of 2008, Outlook Media started its radio program, Radio Outlook which lasted one year.Outlook Weekly changed format to a monthly magazine in 2009, changing names to Outlook Columbus. The final issue of Outlook Weekly was released on March 25, 2009. The monthly format changed the look of the publication by upgrading to paper stock and including more in-depth features while still remaining free to the public. Outlook Columbus has had successful pieces including an article interview with Ohio State football coach Jim Tressel that reached national acclaim. The piece was reprinted on March 3, 2010 in Outsports, which caters to the gay sports community. From here, news of the article reached ESPN, where it was reprinted again on March 4. Sports Illustrated then picked up the story and positively commented on the Tressel interview on March 8, 2010. After the Sports Illustrated article, the story went viral across the country including reports by the San Francisco Chronicle  and The Advocates '150 Reasons to Have Pride' among others.

In July 2012 Chad Frye and Bob Vitale of the Columbus Dispatch joined Christopher Hayes as Co-owners and Co-publishers. The additional partners created capacity to re-launch the publication across the entire state of Ohio, with major distribution hubs in Cincinnati, Cleveland, Columbus, Toledo, Dayton, Youngstown, Canton, and Akron. 
 
In June 2016, Co-publishers Chad Frye and Robert Vitale exited the company, leaving Christopher Hayes as sole owner and publisher.

In July 2017 Outlook ceased publication, and the assets of the company were liquidated.

Notes

External links 
 

LGBT-related magazines published in the United States
Lifestyle magazines published in the United States
Monthly magazines published in the United States
Defunct magazines published in the United States
LGBT in Ohio
Magazines established in 1997
Magazines disestablished in 2017
Magazines published in Ohio
Mass media in Columbus, Ohio